Loving Leah is a television film that aired on CBS as a Hallmark Hall of Fame movie on January 25, 2009. The film is directed by Jeff Bleckner and stars Adam Kaufman as a non-observant Jewish bachelor who feels compelled to marry his rabbi brother's widow, Leah (Lauren Ambrose), to honor him via the ancient Jewish law of yibbum (levirate marriage).

Loving Leah began as a play by P'nenah Goldstein and was brought to Hallmark by Ricki Lake, who appears in a minor role in the film. Goldstein also wrote the screenplay and "saw it in a way like Moonstruck or Crossing Delancey." To prepare for her role, lead actress Lauren Ambrose spent time with women of the close-knit Hasidic community.

Plot
Jake Lever (Adam Kaufman) is a successful cardiologist living in the upscale Georgetown neighborhood of Washington, D.C. When he dozes off at the hospital where he works, he dreams that his brother, Benjamin, tells him that they are okay. Jake is confused and is baffled after receiving a phone call later that day from his mother informing him that his brother has died suddenly. He feels guilty for not having kept in touch with his brother for several years. After Ben's funeral held in Brooklyn, Jake finds out that because his brother's wife Leah (Lauren Ambrose) has been left without children, they must perform a ceremony called halizah to release them both from the religious obligation to conduct a levirate marriage.

Jake and Leah agree, but Jake changes his mind after seeing that Leah is wearing a necklace with exactly the same hamsa  that his brother gave him. Dating from before Benjamin left home for college, the amulet reminds Jake of how much he loved his big brother. He pulls Leah aside and tells her that he doesn't want to deny his brother's existence, which is what he believes the halizah vow requires of him. After deciding that she wants to leave her mother's home, become independent, and start college, Leah agrees to Jake's alternate offer to marry him and move with him to Washington but maintain a platonic relationship. Jake is constantly busy with work at the hospital, his girlfriend Carol has little patience for his new "wife" and Leah adjusts to finding her way around a new city. But eventually, true love arises, and the two find that the greatest gift Benjamin has left them is each other.

Cast
 Lauren Ambrose as Leah Lever
 Adam Kaufman as Jake Lever
 Timothée Chalamet as Young Jake
 Susie Essman as Malka
 Ricki Lake as Rabbi Gerry
 Christy Pusz as Carol
 Mercedes Ruehl as Janice Lever
 Natasha Lyonne as Esther

See also
 Hasidic Judaism

References

External links
 
 Loving Leah at CBS.com

2009 television films
2009 films
American films based on plays
Hallmark Hall of Fame episodes
Films about Jews and Judaism
CBS network films
Films directed by Jeff Bleckner